The Communist Party of Poland (Mijal, sometimes called Marxist–Leninist) was an illegal anti-revisionist Marxist-Leninist communist party founded in 1965 in Albania by Kazimierz Mijal. It was opposed to the Polish United Workers' Party and specifically its leader Władysław Gomułka. It upheld Joseph Stalin against Nikita Khrushchev's criticisms at the 20th Party Congress, instead favoring Maoism and a more hardline stance against the  Catholic clergy, which was opposed by Gomułka. Mijal declared himself Secretary General of the "Temporary Central Committee of the Communist Party of Poland" and took control of Radio Tirana's Polish wing. Mijal's rhetoric proved unpopular to both Polish workers and the intelligentsia, and calls for workers to strike against the government failed to gain support. The Party was supported by China, which helped smuggle pamphlets in Poland, and also had support from the Belgian Maoist La voix du peuple (The Voice of the People), which helped in pamphleteering. Among other prominent members were other Polish communists removed by Gomułka from positions of power such as Hilary Chełchowski and Władysław Dworakowski.  

With the Sino-Albanian Split in 1978, Mijal had a conflict with Enver Hoxha and moved to China in 1978.  In 1983 he returned illegally to Poland and started criticizing the Jaruzelski regime. Since its inception, the Polish government claimed the Polish Communist Party was a puppet of the Chinese Communist Party and had no support in Poland. The party for all practical purposes if not in intent ceased existence after his return.

References
Kazimierz Mijal -- Dogmatic Diehard or Political Adventurer?, Radio Free Europe Research, Poland, 26 June 1967.

1965 establishments in Albania
Banned communist parties
Defunct communist parties in Poland
Anti-revisionist organizations
Stalinist parties
Maoism in Poland
Maoist organizations in Europe
Polish dissident organisations
Political parties established in 1965
Political parties with year of disestablishment missing
China–Poland relations
Albania–Poland relations